The Gloria mine is a mine located in the north of South Africa. Gloria represents one of the largest manganese reserve in South Africa having estimated reserves of 156.2 million tonnes of manganese ore grading 33% manganese metal.

See also
Nchwaning mine
Wessels mine
Mamatwan mine

References 

Manganese mines in South Africa